Berry Blue may refer to:
 Berry Blue, a flavor of Jell-O
 Berry Blue, a flavor of Pebbles cereal
 Berry Blue, a flavor of Fanta
 Berry Blue, a flavor of Jelly Belly
 Berry Blue, a former flavor of Kool-Aid

See also
 Berry Blue Blast, a flavor of Go-Gurt
 Berry Blue Typhoon, a flavor of Hawaiian Punch
 Blueberry (disambiguation)
Barry Blue